The Canadian Hot 100 is a chart that ranks the best-performing singles of Canada. Published by Billboard magazine, its data are similar to Billboard U.S.-based Hot 100 in that it compiles Nielsen SoundScan based collectively on each single's weekly physical and digital sales, as well as airplay. Canada's airplay chart is compiled with information collected from monitoring more than 100 stations that represent rock, country, adult contemporary and contemporary hit radio genres. The online version of the chart features the Canadian flag next to tracks that qualify as Canadian content.

In 2009, eight acts achieved their first Canadian Hot 100 number-one single either as a lead artist or a featured guest:
Kelly Clarkson, Eminem, 50 Cent, Dr. Dre, The Black Eyed Peas, David Guetta, Akon and Kesha. The Black Eyed Peas and Lady Gaga were the only acts to earn two number-one singles in 2009, with the former topping the chart for 25 non-consecutive weeks with their singles "Boom Boom Pow" and "I Gotta Feeling".

In 2009, 9 singles topped the chart. Although 10 singles claimed the top spot in the 52 issues of the magazine, Lady Gaga's "Poker Face" began its peak position in late 2008, and is thus excluded. The Black Eyed Peas' "I Gotta Feeling" topped the Canadian Hot 100 for sixteen consecutive weeks, becoming the longest-running chart-topping single of 2009. Flo Rida's "Right Round" and The Black Eyed Peas' "Boom Boom Pow" tied for the second longest-running number-one single of the year, both with nine non-consecutive weeks. Britney Spears's "3" is noted for its jump from eighty six to first place on the Canadian Hot 100, the largest first place leap since the chart's establishment.



Chart history

See also
2009 in music
List of number-one singles (Canada)
List of Canadian number-one albums of 2009

References

Canada Hot 100
2009
2009 in Canadian music